High Voltage (subtitled Basic Basie Vol. 2) is an album by pianist and bandleader Count Basie  featuring performances recorded in 1970 and released on the MPS label.

Reception

AllMusic awarded the album 4 stars and notes "A dozen generally excellent standards are given overly brief interpretations by the Count Basie Orchestra".

Track listing
 "Chicago" (Fred Fisher) - 2:47
 "Have You Met Miss Jones?" (Richard Rodgers, Lorenz Hart) - 2:43
 "The Lady Is a Tramp" (Rogers, Hart) - 2:53
 "I'm Getting Sentimental Over You" (George Bassman, Ned Washington) - 2:47
 "Bewitched" (Rogers, Hart) - 4:01
 "Day In, Day Out" (Rube Bloom, Johnny Mercer) - 2:34
 "Get Me to the Church on Time" (Frederick Loewe, Alan Jay Lerner) - 2:14
 "When Sunny Gets Blue"(Marvin Fisher, Jack Segal) - 3:38
 "On the Sunny Side of the Street" (Jimmy McHugh, Dorothy Fields) - 2:15
 "Together" (DeSylva-Brown-Henderson) - 3:09
 "If I Were a Bell" (Frank Loesser) - 3:07
 "I Didn't Know What Time It Was" (Rogers, Hart) - 2:11

Personnel 
Count Basie - piano
Sonny Cohn, Gene Goe, Joe Newman, Waymon Reed - trumpet 
Frank Hooks, Grover Mitchell, Buddy Morrow - trombone
Bill Hughes - bass trombone
Bill Adkins, Jerry Dodgion - alto saxophone 
Eric Dixon - tenor saxophone, flute
Eddie "Lockjaw" Davis - tenor saxophone
Cecil Payne - baritone saxophone
Freddie Green - guitar
George Duvivier  - bass
Harold Jones - drums
Chico O'Farrill - arranger

References 

1970 albums
Count Basie Orchestra albums
MPS Records albums
Albums arranged by Chico O'Farrill
Albums produced by Sonny Lester